Zahi Gigi (born 1 December 1988) is an Israeli footballer who currently plays at Maccabi Petah Tikva. He is of a Tunisian-Jewish descent.

Notes

1988 births
Living people
Israeli footballers
Hapoel Ashkelon F.C. players
Maccabi Kiryat Malakhi F.C. players
Maccabi Sha'arayim F.C. players
Maccabi Petah Tikva F.C. players
Liga Leumit players
Israeli Premier League players
Footballers from Ramla
Israeli people of Tunisian-Jewish descent
Association football goalkeepers